The geography of Indonesia is dominated by volcanoes that are formed due to subduction zones between the Eurasian plate and the Indo-Australian plate. Some of the volcanoes are notable for their eruptions, for instance, Krakatoa for its global effects in 1883, the Lake Toba Caldera for its supervolcanic eruption estimated to have occurred 74,000 years before present which was responsible for six years of volcanic winter, and Mount Tambora for the most violent eruption in recorded history in 1815.

Volcanoes in Indonesia are part of the Pacific Ring of Fire. The 150 entries in the list below are grouped into six geographical regions, four of which belong to the volcanoes of the Sunda Arc trench system. The remaining two groups are volcanoes of Halmahera, including its surrounding volcanic islands, and volcanoes of Sulawesi and the Sangihe Islands. The latter group is in one volcanic arc together with the Philippine volcanoes.

The most active volcano is Mount Merapi on Java. Since AD 1000,  Kelut has erupted more than 30 times, of which the largest eruption was at scale 5 on the Volcanic Explosivity Index (VEI), while Mount Merapi has erupted more than 80 times. The International Association of Volcanology and Chemistry of the Earth's Interior has named Mount Merapi as a Decade Volcano since 1995 because of its high volcanic activity.

As of 2012, Indonesia has 127 active volcanoes and about 5 million people active within the danger zones. It has been conjectured that the earthquake and tsunami event of 26 December 2004 could trigger eruptions, with Mount Sinabung (dormant since the 1600s) erupting in 2010 as a possible example.

The word for Mount in Indonesian and many regional languages of the country is Gunung. Thus, Mount Merapi may be referred to as Gunung Merapi.

Scope

There is no single standard definition for a volcano. It can be defined from individual vents, volcanic edifices or volcanic fields. Interior of ancient volcanoes may have been eroded, creating a new subsurface magma chamber as a separate volcano. Many contemporary active volcanoes rise as young parasitic cones from flank vents or at a central crater. Some volcanic cones are grouped into one volcano name, for instance, the Tengger caldera complex, although individual vents are named by local people. The status of a volcano, either active or dormant, cannot be defined precisely. An indication of a volcano is determined by either its historical records, radiocarbon dating, or geothermal activities. 

The primary source of the list below is taken from the Volcanoes of the World book, compiled by two volcanologists Tom Simkin and Lee Siebert, in which active volcanoes in the past 10,000 years (Holocene) are listed. Particularly for Indonesia, Simkin and Siebert used a catalogue of active volcanoes from the International Association of Volcanology and Chemistry of the Earth's Interior publication series. The Simkin and Siebert list is the most complete list of volcanoes in Indonesia, but the accuracy of the record varies from one region to another in terms of contemporary activities and fatalities in recent eruptions. Complementary sources for the latest volcanic data are taken from the Volcanological Survey of Indonesia, a governmental institution which is responsible for volcanic activities and geological hazard mitigation in Indonesia, and some academic resources.

Geographical groups

Sumatra

The geography of Sumatra is dominated by a mountain range called Bukit Barisan (lit: "a row of hills"). The plate moves with a convergence rate of 5.5 cm/year which has created major earthquakes on the western side of Sumatra including the 2004 Sumatra–Andaman earthquake. The tectonic movement has been responsible not only for earthquakes, but also for the formation of magma chambers beneath the island. 

Only one of the 35 active volcanoes, Weh, is separated from the Sumatran mainland. The separation was caused by a large eruption that filled the lowland between Weh and the rest of the mainland with sea water in the Pleistocene epoch. The largest volcano of Sumatra is the supervolcano Toba within the  ×  Lake Toba, which was created after a caldera collapse (est. in 74,000 Before Present). The eruption is estimated to have been at level eight on the VEI scale, the highest level for a volcanic eruption. The highest  peak of the mountain range is Mount Kerinci with an elevation of 3,800 m (12,467 ft).
<onlyinclude>

Sunda Strait and Java
The Sunda Strait separates the islands of Sumatra and Java with the volcanic island Krakatoa lying between them. Krakatau erupted violently in 1883, destroying two-thirds of the island and leaving a large caldera under the sea. This cataclysmic explosion was heard as far away as the island of Rodrigues near Mauritius (approx.  away). A new parasitic cone, called Anak Krakatau (or the child of Krakatau), rose from the sea at the centre of the caldera in 1930. The other Krakatau islets from the 1883 eruptions are known as Sertung, Panjang and Rakata.

Java is a relatively small island compared to Sumatra, but it has a higher concentration of active volcanoes. There are 45 active volcanoes on the island excluding 20 small craters and cones in the Dieng volcanic complex and the young cones in the Tengger caldera complex. Some volcanoes are grouped together in the list below because of their close location. Mount Merapi, Semeru and Kelud are the most active volcanoes in Java. Mount Semeru has been continuously erupting since 1967. Mount Merapi has been named as one of the Decade Volcanoes since 1995. Ijen has a unique colourful caldera lake which is an extremely acidic natural reservoir (pH<0.3). There are sulfur mining activities at Ijen, where miners collect highly concentrated sulfur rocks by hand.
 

Note: Height of Krakatau is of Rakata, not of the active Anak Krakatau

Lesser Sunda Islands
The Lesser Sunda Islands is a small archipelago which, from west to east, consists of Bali, Lombok, Sumbawa, Flores, Sumba and the Timor islands; all are located at the edge of the Australian continental shelf. Volcanoes in the area are formed because of oceanic crusts and the movement of the shelf itself. Some volcanoes completely form an island, for instance, the Sangeang Api island. Mount Tambora, on Sumbawa island, erupted on 5 April 1815, with a scale 7 on the VEI and is considered the most violent eruption in recorded history.

Banda Sea
The Banda Sea in the south of the Molucca archipelago includes a small group of islands. Three major tectonic plates beneath the sea, Eurasian, Pacific and Indo-Australian plates, have been converging since the Mesozoic epoch. Volcanoes in the Banda Sea are mainly islands, but some are submarine volcanoes.

Sulawesi and Sangihe Islands

Four peninsulas dominate the shape of Sulawesi island (formerly known as Celebes). The central part is a high mountainous area, but mostly non-volcanic. Active volcanoes are found in the northern peninsula and continuously stretch to the north to Sangihe Islands. The Sangihe Islands mark the border with the Philippines.

Halmahera
Halmahera island in the north of Molucca archipelago has been formed by the movement of three tectonic plates resulting in two intersecting mountain ranges, which form four rocky peninsulas separated by three deep bays. A volcanic arc stretches from north to south in the west side of Halmahera, some of which are volcanic islands, for instance, Gamalama and Tidore. Gamalama's island name is Ternate and it has been the centre for spice trading since the Portuguese Empire opened a fort in 1512. Due to its location as the centre for spice trading during the Age of Discovery, historical records of volcanic eruptions in Halmahera have been available as far back as the early 16th century.

Major eruptions
Below is a list of selected major eruptions of volcanoes in Indonesia, sorted chronologically by the starting date of the eruption. Only eruptions with scale 3 or above on VEI are given with known sources and fatalities, except if smaller scale eruptions resulted some fatalities.

 
Notes: cv=central vent eruption, pf=pyroclastic flows, lf=lava flows, lm=lahar mudflows, cl=crater lake eruption, ph=phreatic eruption, ld=lava dome extrusion, cc=caldera collapse, se=submarine eruption, fa=fumarole activity, rf=radial fissure eruption.

See also

 List of earthquakes in Indonesia
 Lists of volcanoes
 List of disasters in Indonesia
 Volcanism of Indonesia
 Volcanism of Java
 List of Ultras of the Malay Archipelago

References

General references

Notes

External links

 Volcanological Survey Indonesia
 Indonesian Volcanoes and mountains of Indonesia

Volcanoes
Indonesia